

Awards

FIBA European Champions Cup Finals Top Scorer
 Arvydas Sabonis ( Žalgiris)

External links
FIBA European Champions Cup 1985–86

1985–86 in European basketball
1988–89
1986 in Hungarian sport
1985–86 in Yugoslav basketball
1986 in Soviet sport
International basketball competitions hosted by Hungary